Elections to the Mizoram Legislative Assembly were held in May 1978 to elect members of the 30 constituencies in Mizoram, India. The Mizoram People's Conference emerged as the single largest party and T. Sailo was appointed as the Chief Minister of Mizoram.

The previous ministry, led by Chief Minister C. Chhunga, resigned in May 1977, to facilitate the progress of peace talks (Mizoram Peace Accord). The Union Territory was therefore placed under President's rule, for a year.

Result

Elected Members

See also 
 List of constituencies of the Mizoram Legislative Assembly

References

Mizoram
1978
1978